Pomroy may refer to:

David Pomroy (born 23 June 1983), professional poker player from London, England
Shelly Pomroy, a fictional character in Veronica Mars (season 1)
Pomroy Lake, a lake in Minnesota
Pomroy  Township, Minnesota (disambiguation):
 Pomroy Township, Itasca County, Minnesota
 Pomroy Township, Kanabec County, Minnesota
Colonel Benjamin Pomroy, founder of Eastern Townships Bank
Colin Pomroy, co-founder of Tempo Records (UK)